The Mexican state of Tamaulipas has 102 radio stations, including 19 AM stations, the second-most of any state behind Jalisco.

Ciudad Camargo

FM

Ciudad Mante

FM

Ciudad Miguel Aleman

AM

FM

Matamoros
Matamoros is a border city in the United States-Mexican border Includes radio stations in the Brownsville area. Some radio stations may not be heard everywhere.

AM

FM

Nuevo Laredo

AM

FM

Reynosa

AM

FM

San Fernando

FM

Tampico

FM

Ciudad Victoria

FM

Rural areas

AM

FM

References

Tamaulipas